The 2010–11 West of Scotland Super League Premier Division was the ninth Super League Premier Division competition since the formation of the Scottish Junior Football Association, West Region in 2002. The season began on August 21, 2010. Beith Juniors were the reigning champions. The winners of this competition gain direct entry to round one of the 2011–12 Scottish Cup.

Table

Results

West Region League play-off

Petershill win 1 – 0 on aggregate and retain their place in the West of Scotland Super League Premier Division for the 2011–12 season.

References

6
SJFA West Region Premiership seasons